Farida Khalaf (born circa 1995) is the pen name of a Yazidi woman who was abducted by ISIS in 2014 and sold into slavery. She escaped to a refugee camp, and in 2016 published a book about her experience, The Girl Who Escaped ISIS.

Khalaf grew up in the village of Kocho in the mountains of Iraq. In 2014, when she was 18, ISIS invaded her village. The jihadists murdered all the men and boys of age in the village, including her father and eldest brother. Single women and girls, including Farida and her friend Evin, were forced onto a bus at gunpoint and brought to Raqqa, where they were sold into sexual slavery. She was once beaten so badly by her captors that she lost sight in one eye, and could not walk for two months. The young women managed to escape to a refugee camp in northern Iraq, and Khalaf was reunited with surviving family members. Among members of her community, however, she was seen as having brought dishonor to her family by having been raped. She subsequently moved to Germany, where she hopes to become a mathematics teacher. Her book, The Girl Who Escaped ISIS, was published in 2016 to positive reviews. It was co-authored by German writer Andrea C. Hoffmann, and translated to English by Jamie Bulloch.

See also
 Dalal Khario
 Nadia Murad
 Lamiya Haji Bashar

References

 
1995 births
Living people
21st-century Iraqi women writers
Iraqi Yazidis
Year of birth uncertain
Yazidi women